Proti Agapi (English: First Love) is the debut studio album by popular Greek singer Nikos Oikonomopoulos,  released on 15 November 2007 by Sony BMG Greece. The songs "Ola Gia Sena", Koita Na Mathaineis" and "Den Eisai Entaxei" were the most popular.

Track listing 
"Den Eisai Entaxei" (Δεν Είσαι Εντάξει; You Are Not Okay) – 3:39
"Enklima Kardias" (Έγκλημα Καρδιάς; Crime Heart) – 3:43
"Afto To Asteri" (Αυτό Το Αστέρι; This Star) – 3:16
"Epikindini Agapi" (Επικίνδυνη Αγάπη; Dangerous Love) – 3:22
"Ola Gia Sena" (Όλα Για Σένα; Everything For You) – 4:41
"Ta Eida Ola" (Τα Είδα Όλα; I Saw Them Everything) – 3:47
"De Me Simferei" (Δε Με Συμφέρει; Not with interests) – 3:41
"Proti Agapi" (Πρώτη Αγάπη; First Love) – 3:35
"Perasmenes Treis" (Περασμένες Τρεις; Past Three) – 2:50
"Opos Agapas" (Όπως Αγαπάς; As Love) – 3:31
"Adiaforo" (Αδιαφορώ; Disinterested) – 3:59
"Matia Mou" (Μάτια Μου; My Eyes) – 3:52
"Ase Me Stin Trella Mou" (Άσε Με Στην Τρέλλα Μου; Let Me In insane) – 3:37
"Koita Na Mathaineis" (Κοίτα Να Μαθαίνεις; Look To Learn) – 3:32
"Ola Mas Horizoun" (Όλα Μας Χωρίζουν; All They separate us) – 3:17
"Dio Spasmena Potiria" (Δυο Σπασμένα Ποτήρια; Two Broken Glasses) – 3:49

References

2007 debut albums
Greek-language albums
Sony Music Greece albums
Nikos Oikonomopoulos albums